Marchegiani is an Italian surname. Notable people with the surname include:

 Gabriele Marchegiani (born 1996), Italian footballer
 Luca Marchegiani (born 1966), Italian footballer
 Mario Marchegiani (1917–?), Italian footballer

Italian-language surnames